The 1998 Big 12 Conference women's basketball tournament was held March 3–7, 1998, at Municipal Auditorium in Kansas City, MO.

Number 1 seed  defeated number 3 seed  71–53 to win their first championship and receive the conference's automatic bid to the 1998 NCAA tournament.

Seeding
The Tournament consisted of a 12 team single-elimination tournament with the top 4 seeds receiving a bye.

Schedule

Tournament

All-Tournament team
Most Outstanding Player – Alicia Thompson, Texas Tech

See also
1998 Big 12 Conference men's basketball tournament
1998 NCAA Division I women's basketball tournament
1997–98 NCAA Division I women's basketball rankings

References

Big 12 Conference women's basketball tournament
Tournament
Big 12 Conference women's basketball tournament
Big 12 Conference women's basketball tournament